Batjargalyn Batbayar (born December 3, 1953 in Kharkhorin, Övörkhangai) is a democratic member of the State Great Hural of Mongolia.

Education 
In 1980 he graduated from Krivoi Rog Higher School of Mining in Ukraine. He studied at the Foreign Trade Management Center of the World Trade Institute in New York City in 1993.

Non-political career 
Machinist at the Power Plant III (1971–1974)
Electrical Technician at the Community Service Trust (1980–1981)
Engineer at the Community Service Trust (1981–1985)
Engineer at the Dry-Cleaning State-Owned Enterprise (1985–1989)
Chairman of the Bolor Dry-Cleaning Cooperative (1989–1996)

Political career 
Member of the State Great Hural (1996–2000)
Chairman of the Standing Committee on Environmental Protection of the State Great Hural (1999–2000)
Member of the board of directors of the North East Asian Society (Mongolia) (2000–2004)
Member of the State Great Hural (2004–2008), elected in Chingeltei düüreg
Elected to the State Great Hural in the 2008 Parliamentary Election, for Bayankhongor.

References

External links 
 Batjargalyn Batbayar's Resume

Members of the State Great Khural
1953 births
Living people
Democratic Party (Mongolia) politicians
People from Övörkhangai Province